Raundal is a 2023 Indian Marathi-language action drama film directed by Gajanan Nana Padol and produced by Bhoomika Films and Entertainment in association with Rise Entertainment. Music by Harsshit Abhiraj and background score is by Rohit Nagbhide. It was theatrically released on 3 March 2023.

Cast 

 Bhausaheb Shinde
 Neha Sonwane
 Yashraj Dimbale
 Surekha Dimbale
 Shivraj Walvekar
 Sanjay Lakade
 Ganesh Deshmukh
 Sagar Lokhande

Release 
The film was theatrically released on 3 March 2023 in Marathi. The film has been released in a total of 320 theaters with 890 shows. After the success at the box office, the makers have announced that Raundal will be released in Hindi soon.

Soundtrack 

Music is by Harsshit Abhiraj and songs are recorded by Vaishali Mhade, Ganesh Chandanshiv, Javed Ali and Swaroop Khan. Marathi lyrics by Vinayak Pawar and Hindi by Sudhakar Sharma.

Marathi

Hindi

Reception

References

External links 

 

Indian action drama films
Indian action films
Indian musical films